Louis Tronchin (born at Geneva Dec. 4, 1629; died there Sept. 8, 1705) was a Genevan Calvinist theologian and the son of Théodore Tronchin.

Life
He studied at the Protestant Academy of Saumur under Moses Amyraut, whose "hypothetical universalism" had been vehemently contested by Tronchin the elder; he became pastor of the congregation of Lyons in 1656; and professor of theology at the Genevan Academy in 1661, in which position he represented the liberal trend and advocated tolerance. In 1669 he demanded the abolition of the oath that was imposed on all candidates [in theology], not to attempt any innovations in the Calvinist doctrine.

Works
His works were:

 Disputatio de providentia Dei (Geneva, 1670)
 De auctoritate Scripturæ Sacræ (1677)

Bibliography
 Eugene Haag and Émile Haag, La France protestante, vol. ix, P 225.. 2d ed., Paris, 1877 sqq.; 
 J. Gaberel. Histoire de l'Église de Geneve, vol. iii., Geneva, 1862
 Charles Borgeaud, L'Academie de Calvin, Geneva, 1900
 Frédéric Auguste Lichtenberger, Encyclopédie des sciences religieuses, xii 234- 236.

Attribution

1629 births
1705 deaths
Theologians from the Republic of Geneva
Calvinist and Reformed Christians
17th-century people from the Republic of Geneva
17th-century Calvinist and Reformed theologians
18th-century Calvinist and Reformed theologians
Academic staff of the University of Geneva